Modern pentathlon was one of the many sports which was held at the 2002 Asian Games in Changwon International Shooting Range, Changwon Evergreen Hall, Changwon Swimming Pool, Busan Equestrian Grounds and Samnak Riverside Athletic Park in Changwon and Busan, South Korea between 10 and 13 October 2002.

The host nation South Korea finished first in medal table with four gold medals.

Schedule

Medalists

Men

Women

Medal table

Participating nations
A total of 48 athletes from 8 nations competed in modern pentathlon at the 2002 Asian Games:

References

2002 Asian Games Official Report, Pages 488–514

External links
 Official website

 
2002 Asian Games events
2002
Asian Games
2002 Asian Games